Vaadhoo as a place name may refer to:
 Vaadhoo (Gaafu Dhaalu Atoll), Republic of Maldives
 Vaadhoo (Kaafu Atoll), Republic of Maldives
 Vaadhoo (Raa Atoll), Republic of Maldives